The Wisconsin Tax Appeals Commission is an independent state agency that was created by the Wisconsin State Legislature to hear and determine disputes between taxpayers and the Wisconsin Departments of Revenue and Transportation.  The Wisconsin Tax Appeals Commission also resolves tax disputes in the areas of individual income, corporate income, county sales tax, cigarette use, homestead credit, and many more. It has its own website, beginning in 2021, at https://taxappeals.wi.gov/Pages/home.aspx.

References

State agencies of Wisconsin